The list below shows the leading Thoroughbred sire of broodmares in North America for each year since 1924. This is determined by the amount of prize money won during the year by racehorses which were foaled by a daughter of the sire.  The most frequent sires on the list are Sir Gallahad III (12), Mr. Prospector (9), Princequillo (8), and Star Shoot (5).

 1924 - Star Shoot (1) 
 1925 - Star Shoot (2)
 1926 - Star Shoot (3)
 1927 -
 1928 - Star Shoot (4)
 1929 - Star Shoot (5)
 1930 - Celt (1)
 1931 - Fair Play (1)
 1932 - Broomstick (1)
 1933 - Broomstick (2)
 1934 - Fair Play (2)
 1935 - Wrack (1)
 1936 - High Time (1)
 1937 - Sweep (1)
 1938 - Fair Play (1)
 1939 - Sir Gallahad III (1)
 1940 - High Time (2)
 1941 - Sweep (1)
 1942 - Chicle (1)
 1943 - Sir Gallahad III (2)
 1944 - Sir Gallahad III (3)
 1945 - Sir Gallahad III (4)
 1946 - Sir Gallahad III (5)
 1947 - Sir Gallahad III (6)
 1948 - Sir Gallahad III (7)
 1949 - Sir Gallahad III (8)
 1950 - Sir Gallahad III (9)
 1951 - Sir Gallahad III (10)
 1952 - Sir Gallahad III (11)
 1953 - Bull Dog (1)
 1954 - Bull Dog (2)
 1955 - Sir Gallahad III (12)
 1956 - Bull Dog (3)

 1957 - Mahmoud (1)
 1958 - Bull Lea (2)
 1959 - Bull Lea (3)
 1960 - Bull Lea (4)
 1961 - Bull Lea (5)
 1962 - War Admiral (1)
 1963 - Count Fleet (1)
 1964 - War Admiral (2)
 1965 - Roman (1)
 1966 - Princequillo (1)
 1967 - Princequillo (2)
 1968 - Princequillo (3)
 1969 - Princequillo (4)
 1970 - Princequillo (5)
 1971 - Double Jay (1)
 1972 - Princequillo (6)
 1973 - Princequillo (7)
 1974 - Olympia (1)
 1975 - Double Jay (2)
 1976 - Princequillo (8)
 1977 - Double Jay (3)
 1978 - Crafty Admiral (1)
 1979 - Prince John (1)
 1980 - Prince John (2)
 1981 - Double Jay (4)
 1982 - Prince John (3)
 1983 - Buckpasser (1)
 1984 - Buckpasser (2)
 1985 - Speak John (1)
 1986 - Prince John (4)
 1987 - Hoist The Flag (1)
 1988 - Buckpasser (3)
 1989 - Buckpasser (4)

 1990 - Grey Dawn II (1)
 1991 - Northern Dancer (1)
 1992 - Secretariat (1)
 1993 - Nijinsky (1)
 1994 - Nijinsky (2)
 1995 - Seattle Slew (1)
 1996 - Seattle Slew (2)
 1997 - Mr. Prospector (1)
 1998 - Mr. Prospector (2)
 1999 - Mr. Prospector (3)
 2000 - Mr. Prospector (4)
 2001 - Mr. Prospector (5)
 2002 - Mr. Prospector (6)
 2003 - Mr. Prospector (7)
 2004 - Dixieland Band (1)
 2005 - Mr. Prospector (8)
 2006 - Mr. Prospector (9)
 2007 - Deputy Minister (1)
 2008 - Sadler's Wells (1)
 2009 - Sadler's Wells (2)
 2010 - Sadler's Wells (3)
 2011 - Danehill (1)
 2012 - Storm Cat (1)
 2013 - Storm Cat (2)
 2014 - Storm Cat (3)
 2015 - A.P. Indy (1)
 2016 - Sunday Silence (1)
 2017 - Distorted Humor (1)
 2018 - Giant's Causeway (1)
 2019 - Sunday Silence (2)
 2020 - Sunday Silence (3)
 2021 - A.P. Indy (2)

References
 bloodhorse.com
 tbheritage.com

See also
 Leading sire in Australia
 Leading sire in France
 Leading sire in Germany
 Leading sire in Great Britain & Ireland
 Leading sire in Japan
 Leading broodmare sire in Japan
 Leading sire in North America
 Leading broodmare sire in Great Britain & Ireland

Horse racing in Canada
Horse racing in the United States